Salvia apiana, the white sage, bee sage, or sacred sage is an evergreen perennial shrub that is native to the southwestern United States and northwestern Mexico, found mainly in the coastal sage scrub habitat of Southern California and Baja California, on the western edges of the Mojave and Sonoran deserts.

Description
Leaves are thickly covered in hairs that trigger oil glands; when rubbed oils and resins are released, producing a strong aroma. The flowers are very attractive to bees, which is described by the specific epithet, apiana. Several  flower stalks, sometimes pinkish colored, grow above the foliage in the spring. Flowers are white to pale lavender.

Distribution and habitat 
White sage is a common plant that requires well-drained dry soil, full sun, and little water. The plant occurs on dry slopes in coastal sage scrub, chaparral, and yellow-pine forests of Southern California to Baja California at less than  elevation.

Ecology
Flowers attract varied pollinators including bumblebees, carpenter bees, Bombyliidae, and hummingbirds. However most of these species are ineffective pollinators, with only three species of carpenter bee and one species of bumblebee actually leading to routine pollination.

Pests and disease 
The terpenoids and essential oils found in white sage likely deter herbivory.

Uses

Salvia apiana is widely used by Native American peoples on the Pacific coast of the United States. The seed is a primary, traditional ingredient in pinole, a staple food. The Cahuilla people have traditionally harvested large quantities of the seed, then mixed it with wheat flour and sugar to make gruel and biscuits. The leaves and stems are a traditional food among the Chumash people and neighboring communities.

For healing use, several tribes have traditionally used the seed for removing foreign objects from the eye, similar to the way that Clary sage seeds have been used in Europe. A tea from the roots is traditional among the Cahuilla women for healing and strength after childbirth. Different parts of the plant are also used in ceremonies by several Native American cultures.

Conservation 
Over-harvest of wild white sage populations is a concern held by many Native American groups and conservationists. Over-harvesting is negatively affecting the wild population and distribution of white sage. It is believed that illegal harvest is occurring on public lands and non-permitted harvesting is also taking place on private land. In June 2018, four people were arrested for the illegal harvest of 400 pounds of white sage in North Etiwanda Preserve of Rancho Cucamonga, California. Due to its endangered status and sacredness to certain Indigenous tribes, many Native Americans have asked non-Natives to refrain from the usage of white sage.

Deputies said in a statement that white sage is protected by the Endangered Species Act of 1973, which is a common misconception. Collecting plants without permission from a landowner or land manager is illegal. Although white sage is not listed on the Endangered Species List, conservationists are still concerned about the future survival and distribution of the species. The destruction of white sage has become a focus of the Tongva Taraxat Paxaavxa Conservancy.

Cultivation
Salvia apiana prefers a sunny location, well draining soil, and good air circulation. It easily hybridizes with other Salvia species, particularly Salvia leucophylla and Salvia clevelandii.

References

External links

 White Sage - photograph
 Jepson Flora Project - Salvia apiana
 
 
 

apiana
Flora of California
Flora of Baja California
Flora of the California desert regions
Flora of the Sonoran Deserts
Natural history of the California chaparral and woodlands
Natural history of the Colorado Desert
Natural history of the Mojave Desert
Natural history of the Peninsular Ranges
Natural history of the Santa Monica Mountains
Natural history of the Transverse Ranges
Plants used in Native American cuisine
Plants used in traditional Native American medicine
Garden plants of North America
Drought-tolerant plants
Flora without expected TNC conservation status